The Puente Alsina, formerly known as the Puente Uriburu, is a neo-colonial bridge inaugurated in 1938, that joins the neighbourhood of Nueva Pompeya in the Argentine capital (Buenos Aires) with the city of Valentín Alsina (District of Lanús, Gran Buenos Aires), crossing over the Riachuelo.

External links
 Famous Bridges in the World for Photography

Bridges completed in 1938
Bridges in Argentina
Bascule bridges